The following is a list of Villa María del Triunfo District's mayors in Lima Province in the 20th and 21st centuries.

 Leonardo Maraví Olivos, 1962-1963
 Andrés Antezana Sánchez, 1963-1964 
 Aroldo Prettell Vega, APRA-UNO 1964-1966
 Aroldo Prettell Vega, APRA-UNO 1967-1969
 Pedro Valle Medina, 1970-1972
 Emilio Suicho Apac, 1972-1977
 Luis Mendoza Sagaceta, 1979-1980
 Alfredo Valle V., 1980 
 Oscar López Chávez,  AP 1981-1983
 Washington Armando Ipenza Pacheco, IU (UNIR) 1984-1986
 Walter Machuca Arteta,  PAP 1987-1989
  Luis Max Villavicencio Torres, IU (PUM) 1990-1992
 Aniceto Ibarguen Rios, OBRAS 1993-1995
 Rafael Chacón Saavedra,  Cambio 90 - Nueva Mayoría 1996-1998
 Washington Armando Ipenza Pacheco, Somos Perú 1999-2002
 Washington Armando Ipenza Pacheco, Somos Perú 2003-2006
 Juan José Castillo Angeles,  Unidad Nacional 2007-2010

Villa Maria del Triunfo